James McCallum may refer to:

James McCallum (cyclist) (born 1979), Scottish racing cyclist
James McCallum (politician) (1806–1889), American Confederate politician